Virden/R.J. (Bob) Andrew Field Regional Aerodrome  is located  north of Virden, Manitoba, Canada. 

During World War II, Virden airport was home to No. 19 Elementary Flying Training School, part of the British Commonwealth Air Training Plan.

As of the summer of 2010, one of the original hangars was still standing.

See also
Virden (West) Airport
Virden (Gabrielle Farm) Airport

References

External links
Page about this airport on COPA's Places to Fly airport directory

Registered aerodromes in Manitoba
Airports of the British Commonwealth Air Training Plan